Nugaal is an intermittent river that runs along the Nugaal Valley. It begins several miles to the west of Sool, and ends at Eyl where the outlet flows into the Indian Ocean. It evaporates at the onset of the hagaa, the Somali dry season. Due to mismanagement, the river bed has gone increasingly dry, and several Somali politicians have discussed repairing the damage.

Eponyms
The Nugaal has three eponyms:
Nugaal Valley, a valley widest in Sool, but narrower in Nugaal bari
Nugaal Region, a province with Garowe at its center
Nugaal Plateau, the flat terrain above the Nugaal Valley also called Sorl
Nogal-Sool district, a Dhulbahante province that included Buuhoodle district during British colonial rule

See also
Shebelle river

References 

Rivers of Somalia